Lloyd Kramer is an American filmmaker known for directing made-for-TV films such as The Five People You Meet in Heaven.

Television filmography

As director
Nine (1992, documentary)
ABC Afterschool Specials (1993, 1 episode, "Girlfriend")
Before Women Had Wings (1997)
David and Lisa (1998)
All-American Girl: The Mary Kay Letourneau Story (2000)
Amy & Isabelle (2001)
Report from Ground Zero (2002)
The Five People You Meet in Heaven (2004)
Oprah Winfrey Presents: Mitch Albom's For One More Day (2007)
America in Primetime (2011, 4 episodes, also produced)
Liz & Dick (2012)

References

External links
 

American television producers
American television directors
Living people
Year of birth missing (living people)